The  is the name of a Japanese aerial lift line in Shimoda, Shizuoka, as well as its operator. The company is a subsidiary of Izukyū Corporation. The line is also called , as it climbs Mount Nesugata. The observatory has a view of Port of Shimoda and Pacific Ocean. The line began operation on April 1, 1961.

Basic data
System: Aerial tramway, 3 cables
Cable length: 
Vertical interval: 
Maximum gradient: 26°49′
Operational speed: 3.6 m/s
Passenger capacity per a cabin: 41
Cabins: 2
Stations: 2
Duration of one-way trip: 3 minutes 30 seconds

See also
Izu Kyūkō Line
List of aerial lifts in Japan

External links
 Official website

Aerial tramways in Japan
Tourist attractions in Shizuoka Prefecture
Transport in Shizuoka Prefecture
1961 establishments in Japan
Shimoda, Shizuoka